The Colours of Chloë is an album by German double bassist and composer Eberhard Weber recorded in 1973 and released on the ECM label.

Reception 
The Allmusic review by David R. Adler awarded the album 4½ stars, stating, "Eberhard Weber's first record remains his most well-known and influential. An ambitious work of what might be called symphonic jazz, The Colours of Chloë helped to define the ECM sound -- picturesque, romantic, at times rhythmically involved, at others minimalistic and harmonically abstruse... People will disagree about whether The Colours of Chloë stands the test of time, but Weber's aesthetic played a significant role in the creative music of the '70s, attracting a fair share of emulators".

Track listing
All compositions by Eberhard Weber.

Personnel
Eberhard Weber – bass, cello, ocarina, voice
Rainer Brüninghaus – piano, synthesizer
Peter Giger – drums
Ralf Hübner – drums (track 2)
Ack van Rooyen – fluegelhorn
Gisela Schäuble – voice
celli of the Südfunk Orchestra, Stuttgart

References

ECM Records albums
Eberhard Weber albums
1974 albums
Albums produced by Manfred Eicher